Marijo is a South Slavic masculine given name, cognate to Mario. Notable people with the name include:

Marijo Baković (born 1982), retired Croatian long jumper
Marijo Dodik (born 1974), Bosnian Croat football striker
Marijo Marić (born 1977), Croatian footballer
Marijo Moćić (born 1989), Slovenian football midfielder
Marijo Možnik (born 1987), Croatian gymnast
Marijo Šivolija (born 1981), Croatian amateur boxer and two-time Olympian
Marijo Strahonja, Croatian association football referee
Marijo Tot (born 1972), Croatian football manager

See also
Zdravo Marijo (English: Hail Mary) is the tenth studio album by Croatian singer Severina
Zdravo Marijo Tour, concert tour of Croatian pop singer Severine Vučković
Marjo (name)

Croatian masculine given names